O'Connor Building may refer to:

 Sandra Day O'Connor United States Courthouse, also known as Sandra Day O'Connor Federal Building, Phoenix, Arizona
 J.S. O'Connor American Rich Cut Glassware Factory, Hawley, Pennsylvania
 Morrison Block, also known as M. O'Connor Grocery Wholesalers, Indianapolis, Indiana
 O'Connor-Proctor Building, Victoria, Texas

See also
O'Connor House (disambiguation)